is a Japanese footballer currently playing for Tomislav Drnje.

Career statistics

Club

Notes

References

1993 births
Living people
Association football people from Osaka Prefecture
Japanese footballers
Japanese expatriate footballers
Association football midfielders
Gamba Osaka players
Nara Club players
FK Auda players
OKS Stomil Olsztyn players
Japan Football League players
I liga players
Japanese expatriate sportspeople in Thailand
Expatriate footballers in Thailand
Expatriate footballers in Slovenia
Japanese expatriate sportspeople in Latvia
Expatriate footballers in Latvia
Japanese expatriate sportspeople in Poland
Expatriate footballers in Poland